A deficiency is generally a lack of something. It may also refer to:

A deficient number, in mathematics, a number n for which σ(n) < 2n
 Angular deficiency, in geometry, the difference between a sum of angles and the corresponding sum in a Euclidean plane
 Deficiency (graph theory), a property describing how far a given graph is from having a perfect matching
Deficiency (medicine), including various types of malnutrition, as well as genetic diseases caused by deficiencies of endogenously produced proteins
A deficiency in construction, an item, or condition that is considered sub-standard, or below minimum expectations
Genetic deletion, in genetics, also called a deficiency
A deficiency judgment, in the law of real estate
A tax deficiency, an amount owed in taxes over and above what has been submitted in payment

ar:نقص
de:Mangel
no:Mangel